Kertész is a Hungarian occupational surname, which means gardener, derived from kert and kertez ("garden"). Alternative spellings include Kertesz and Kertes. The surname may refer to:

Adolf Kertész (1892–1920), Hungarian footballer
Alice Kertész (born 1935), Hungarian gymnast
Amir Kertes (born 1975), Israeli musician
André Kertész (1894–1985), Hungarian photographer
Daniella Kertesz (born 1989), Israeli actress
Dezsö Kertész (1892–1965), Hungarian actor
Edith Kertész-Gabry (1927–2012), Hungarian singer
Géza Kertész (1894–1945), Hungarian football player and manager
 Gyula Kertész (1888–1982), Hungarian footballer
Imre Kertész (1929–2016), Hungarian writer
István Kertész (conductor) (1929–1973), Hungarian conductor
István Kertész (diplomat) (1904–1986), Hungarian diplomat
János Kertész (born 1965), Hungarian physicist
Joseph Kertes (born 1951), Canadian writer
Kálmán Kertész (1867–1922), Hungarian entomologist
Manó Kertész Kaminer (Kertész Mihály) (1886–1962), birth name of Hungarian-American film director Michael Curtiz
Mihalj Kertes (born 1947), Serbian politician
Tom Kertes (born 1973), American political activist
Vilmos Kertész (1890–1962), Hungarian footballer
Zoltan I. Kertesz (1903–1968), Hungarian food scientist

See also
Kertész (crater), a crater on Mercury

References

Hungarian-language surnames